"Rockin' Years" is a song written by Floyd Parton, and recorded as a duet by American country music artists Dolly Parton and Ricky Van Shelton.  it was released in February 1991 as the lead-off single to both Parton's album Eagle When She Flies and Shelton's album Backroads, and on both albums, it is track #2 on each of the albums track lists.  The song reached the top of the Billboard Hot Country Singles & Tracks (now Hot Country Songs) chart, giving Parton her twenty-fourth number one and Shelton his eighth.  The song would be Parton's last chart-topper until 2006.

Content
The song is a mid-tempo country waltz in which two narrators — a male and a female — promise to love each other until their "rockin' years"; i.e., when they are old and sitting in rocking chairs together.

Chart performance

Year-end charts

Other recorded versions
An unreleased duet between George Jones and Parton was recorded in 1988 but remained unreleased until the release of his 2008 album Burn Your Playhouse Down - The Unreleased Duets.

References

1991 singles
1991 songs
Dolly Parton songs
Ricky Van Shelton songs
Male–female vocal duets
George Jones songs
Columbia Nashville Records singles
Song recordings produced by Steve Buckingham (record producer)
Music videos directed by Michael Salomon